Parris is a surname and a given name.

Parris may also refer to:

Places
 Parris, Texas, a ghost town in Collin County, Texas, USA
 Parris Island (disambiguation)
 Parris Island, South Carolina, United States
 Parris Brook Historic and Archeological District, Exeter, Rhode Island, USA

Other uses
 Parris Manufacturing Company, U.S. toy manufacturer

See also
 Parri (surname); plural as "Parris"
 Noyes-Parris House, Massachusetts
 Paris (disambiguation)
 Paris, France